Samuel Galindo Suheiro (born 18 April 1992 in Santa Cruz) is a Bolivian footballer who plays for Club Always Ready as an attacking midfielder.

Club career
Galindo was signed by Arsenal in January 2010, from Bolivian club Real America. He was loaned to UD Salamanca at the start of the 2010–11 season.

For the 2011–12 season, Galindo was loaned to another Spanish club. This time, to Gimnàstic de Tarragona.

For the 2012–13 season, Galindo sealed his third loan spell in three consecutive seasons with CD Lugo, in the Spanish second division. He only appeared in 5 games for the club, which prompted him to move back to Arsenal earlier than expected.

After the unsuccessful spell with Lugo, he moved back to Bolivia to play for Club Jorge Wilstermann. During his time at Club Jorge Wilstermann, he played seven games, he didn't score nor assist during that time.

Galindo was not loaned out in the 2013–14 season and played no football for the U21 team in the first half of the season as he did not have a work permit. He joined Colorado Rapids on trial in January 2014.

On 9 January 2015, Galindo joined Brazilian club Portuguesa. On 23 January, however, he was recalled by Arsenal, who decided to cancel his loan to Lusa.

International career
Galindo represented Bolivia for the first time in an international friendly against Mexico in February 2010. He has also served as captain of Bolivia's Under 20 team and Under 17 team. He has since played against Panama in a 1–3 friendly defeat.

References

External links

1992 births
Living people
Sportspeople from Santa Cruz de la Sierra
Bolivian footballers
Association football midfielders
Arsenal F.C. players
UD Salamanca players
Gimnàstic de Tarragona footballers
CD Lugo players
C.D. Jorge Wilstermann players
Associação Portuguesa de Desportos players
Oriente Petrolero players
Club Always Ready players
Segunda División players
Bolivian Primera División players
Bolivia international footballers
Bolivian expatriate footballers
Expatriate footballers in England
Expatriate footballers in Spain
Expatriate footballers in Brazil
Bolivian expatriate sportspeople in England
Bolivian expatriate sportspeople in Spain
Bolivian expatriate sportspeople in Brazil